Baki is a town in the northwestern Awdal region of Somaliland. It is the capital of the Baki district.

Demographics
Baki is inhabited by the Reer Nuur branch of the Makahiil and Reer Mohamed branch of the Mahad 'Ase subclans of the Gadabuursi Dir clan.

See also
Administrative divisions of Somaliland
Regions of Somaliland
Districts of Somaliland

References
Jaaraahorato

Notes

Populated places in Awdal